Coercion is compelling a party to act in an involuntary manner by the use of threats, including threats to use force against a party. It involves a set of forceful actions which violate the free will of an individual in order to induce a desired response. These actions may include extortion, blackmail, or even torture and sexual assault. For example, a bully may demand lunch money from a student where refusal results in the student getting beaten.

In common law systems, the act of violating a law while under coercion is codified as a duress crime. 

Coercion can be used as leverage to force the victim to act in a way contrary to their own interests. Coercion can involve not only the infliction of bodily harm, but also psychological abuse (the latter intended to enhance the perceived credibility of the threat). The threat of further harm may also lead to the acquiescence of the person being coerced.

The concepts of coercion and persuasion are similar, but various factors distinguish the two. These include the intent, the willingness to cause harm, the result of the interaction, and the options available to the coerced party.

John Rawls, Thomas Nagel, Ronald Dworkin, and other political authors argue that the state is coercive. Max Weber defined a state as "a community which has a monopoly on the legitimate use of force." Morris argues that the state can operate through incentives rather than coercion. In healthcare, informal coercion may be used to make a patient adhere to a doctor's treatment plan. Under certain circumstances, physical coercion is used to treat a patient involuntarily.

Overview
The purpose of coercion is to substitute one's aims to those of the victim. For this reason, many social philosophers have considered coercion as the polar opposite to freedom.

Various forms of coercion are distinguished: first on the basis of the kind of injury threatened, second according to its aims and scope, and finally according to its effects, from which its legal, social, and ethical implications mostly depend.

Physical
Physical coercion is the most commonly considered form of coercion, where the content of the conditional threat is the use of force against a victim, their relatives or property. An often used example is "putting a gun to someone's head" (at gunpoint) or putting a "knife under the throat" (at knifepoint or cut-throat) to compel action under the threat that non-compliance may result in the attacker harming or even killing the victim. These are so common that they are also used as metaphors for other forms of coercion.

Armed forces in many countries use firing squads to maintain discipline and intimidate the masses, or opposition, into submission or silent compliance. However, there also are nonphysical forms of coercion, where the threatened injury does not immediately imply the use of force. Byman and Waxman (2000) define coercion as "the use of threatened force, including the limited use of actual force to back up the threat, to induce an adversary to behave differently than it otherwise would." Coercion does not in many cases amount to destruction of property or life since compliance is the goal.

Psychological

In psychological coercion, the threatened injury regards the victim's relationships with other people. The most obvious example is blackmail, where the threat consists of the dissemination of damaging information. However, many other types are possible e.g. "emotional blackmail", which typically involves threats of rejection from or disapproval by a peer-group, or creating feelings of guilt/obligation via a display of anger or hurt by someone whom the victim loves or respects.

See also

Notes

References
 
 Lifton, Robert J. (1961) Thought Reform and the Psychology of Totalism, Penguin Books.

External links

 
 .
 Carter, Barry E. Economic Coercion, Max Planck Encyclopedia of Public International Law (subscription required)

 
Abuse
Authority
Bullying
Legal terminology
Psychological abuse
Interrogation techniques
Power (social and political) concepts